Josileudo Rodrigues de Araujo (born 28 March 1989), known as Bileu, is a Brazilian footballer who plays for Santa Cruz as a midfielder.

Career statistics

References

External links

1989 births
Living people
Brazilian footballers
Association football midfielders
Campeonato Brasileiro Série B players
Campeonato Brasileiro Série C players
Fortaleza Esporte Clube players
Club Athletico Paranaense players
ABC Futebol Clube players
Sport Club do Recife players
Santa Cruz Futebol Clube players
Clube Atlético Linense players
Tombense Futebol Clube players
Botafogo Futebol Clube (SP) players
Cuiabá Esporte Clube players
Atlético Clube Goianiense players
Volta Redonda FC players
Sportspeople from Ceará